Tibor Csehi (born 27 March 1963) is a Hungarian midfielder who formerly played for several clubs in Hungary, before retiring in 1997.

References

1963 births
Association football midfielders
Budapest Honvéd FC players
Dunaújváros FC players
Hungarian footballers
Nyíregyháza Spartacus FC players
Living people
Hungary international footballers